Chahar Cherik (also Romanized as Chahār Cherīk and Chehār Charik) is a village in Zalian Rural District, Zalian District, Shazand County, Markazi Province, Iran. At the 2006 census, its population was 288, in 81 families.

References 

Populated places in Shazand County